Nadezhda Nikitichna Mikhalkova (born September 27, 1986) is a Russian actress.

Nadezhda is the youngest daughter of actor and film director Nikita Mikhalkov and fashion designer Tatyana Shigaeva. Her brother Artyom and sister Anna are also actors. Nadezhda, aged 6, starred as Nadia Kotova in the film Burnt by the Sun directed by her father, who also played Nadia's father in the film. The film received the Grand Prize at Cannes and the Academy Award for Best Foreign Language Film, among many other honours.

Nadezhda made an episodic appearance in the 1999 film The Barber of Siberia, also directed by Nikita Mikhalkov. In the 2000 film President and his Granddaughter directed by Tigran Keosayan Mikhalkova played twin sisters. In 2008 she graduated from the School of International Journalism in Moscow State Institute of International Relations. She reprised her role as Nadya Kotova, now a teenager, in the 2010 film Burnt by the Sun 2.

Mikhalkova is married to director and producer Rezo Gigineishvili. She gave birth to a daughter in Moscow on May 21, 2011.

Filmography

References

External links

1986 births
Actresses from Moscow
Living people
Moscow State Institute of International Relations alumni
Russian child actresses
Russian film actresses
Russian film directors
Russian women film directors
Mikhalkov family